Westdale Secondary School is a public high school founded in 1931 in Hamilton, Ontario, Canada.  It is a school in the city of Hamilton and is located in Westdale Village, a suburb in the west-end of the city. It is administered by the Hamilton-Wentworth District School Board.  Westdale is also the most populated public high school in Hamilton, Ontario.

History
Westdale was founded as a collegiate school—housing three collegiates under one roof—and was, at a time, the largest school of its kind in the British Commonwealth. The original building was referred to as "Westdale Composite School", or "Westdale Tripartite School", because it housed three separate schools. The collegiate, technical and commercial schools were housed on the left, middle, and right side of the school, with the cafeteria on the fourth floor (the cafeteria has since moved to the first floor). Mr Nurmi currently teaches business at Westdale Secondary School and is revered as a teacher. The architects Prack and Prack designed the building with arched doorways and pseudo-buttresses of the "school gothic" architectural style. Constructed by J.M. Pigott Construction Company at an initial cost of $1,306,521 (including 4.7 hectares of land), the school has undergone four major renovations, which occurred in 1959, 1974, 1975 and 2018 (currently underway). Westdale Secondary school has also become an IB school as of 2008.

Charity activities
Westdale regularly participates in and plays host to numerous fundraisers and awareness rallies. Each year the students organise such events as Keep the Beat, Coffee House, and the 30 Hour Famine. Westdale makes annual contributions to the Stephen Lewis Foundation through crêpe sales and other fund raiser activities. In 2005, Westdale students were part of the effort to keep the Victoria Cross of Frederick George Topham in Canada, as it was being auctioned off by his family. Westdale also runs an annual canned food drive for the food banks in Hamilton.

Terry Fox Run
Westdale Secondary also raises money for cancer research every year in the Terry Fox Run. Westdale students collect pledges in the weeks before the run, then they may choose to walk, jog, or run through Westdale Village. Over 2 million people around the world participate in the Terry Fox Run every year.

Drama and theatre
Theatre Westdale participates in the Sears Drama Festival, putting on annual productions of musicals, and a host of other activities including an annual 24-hour Improvathon. In terms of musicals, in 2004 Theatre Westdale performed West Side Story to audiences in four sold-out nights and in 2005 they performed Grease. At the Sears Festival in early 2005 Westdale submitted two plays, The Complete Works of William Shakespeare (Abridged) and The Least Offensive Play in the Whole Darn World. Both plays won numerous awards and The Complete Works advanced to the provincial showcase. The following year (2006) Westdale submitted the Greek tragedy Antigone to the festival and won much critical acclaim, including 4 out of the 17 awards available at the regional level of the competition. In 2007, Westdale again entered two plays: The Bible: The Complete Word of God (Abridged), and The Bald Soprano. The Bald Soprano advanced to the provincial showcase, winning a total of twelve awards throughout the 2007 festival. The 2008 Sears Festival year included one entry from Westdale, the student-written, student-directed play Prizefighter. The play received 10 awards at the District and Regional levels, including one for outstanding prop direction.

During 2007–2008, Westdale ran a pilot program of a Theatre Production course, in which students learn the on- and back-stage jobs that go into producing and performing a musical production. The production, Guys And Dolls, was performed in January 2008.  Theatre Westdale's 2008–2009 production, Cabaret, was performed in December 2008 and was directed by Erin Newton.  In 2009, Westdale performed a Sears Drama Festival entry named Enter Alice which was written and directed by Aaron Jan.  The play received three awards in the District Festival (Awards of Excellence for Costumes, Performance, and Original Script) and three awards at the Regional Showcase (Costumes, Performance and Original Script). On 9/10 December Theatre Westdale performed the musical Annie which sold out for all matinee performances. In 2010 for the Ontario Sears Drama Festival the cast did a student written play by Aaron Jan. The play is called Rain which deals with the issues of homophobia in a high school setting. Rain won 4 awards including 1 for performance, lighting and direction and an outstanding performance award. The play went on to win 4 more awards for performance, dancing, stage management and the adjudicator's award for script. In 2010/11 Theatre Westdale put on the musical Footloose. In 2011 for the Ontario Sears Drama Festival Westdale performed a production of Elephant's Graveyard. In 2012 a collective of students wrote the Historical piece Triangle, the collective focuses on the Triangle Shirtwaist Factory fire and the problems of working without a union. The collective was performed at the District, Regional and Provincial levels of the Sears Ontario Drama Festival winning awards in Stage Management, Music, Acting, Technical Theatre and Direction. In 2012, Theatre Westdale presented a representation of Little Shop of Horrors, by Alan Menken and Howard Ashman, however the production was cut short because of the labor dispute between the Ontario Government and the Teacher's Unions. Following the labor dispute, Westdale put on two productions in the spring of 2013 for the Sears Drama Festival, Drafts and Asylum, directed by students Greg Waters and Russel Niessen, respectively.

Extra curriculars

Music
Westdale has many music groups, including the Jr. Band, Sr. Band, Marching Band, Orchestra, Chamber Orchestra, Jr. Jazz, Sr. Jazz, and the Choir. The music department at Westdale competes regularly in local and international music festivals and competitions. In recent years, the music department has consistently won a variety of awards in the Golden Horseshoe Music Festival, which is hosted from Redeemer University College in Hamilton, Ontario. The music department at Westdale Secondary School also puts on concerts and events throughout the school year for students, parents and staff members.

DECA
Westdale Secondary School has a DECA chapter with members ranking in the Regional, Provincial and International levels. The Westdale DECA team often achieves top places at the regional, provincial and international level. DECA at Westdale is operated as a student-run, teacher-supervised club.

Model United Nations
Model United Nations (Model UN, or MUN) is an academic simulation of the United Nations that aims to educate participants about current events, topics in international relations, diplomacy and the United Nations agenda. Westdale students rank highly in Model UN conferences, and also host HAMMUN every year, a conference with participation from across Southern Ontario.

Specialist High Skills Major
The Specialist High Skills Major Program (SHSM) is a ministry-approved program which allows students to focus 
their skills in specific areas of interest as they earn their Ontario Secondary Diploma. Westdale Secondary School students have the option to complete their Specialist High Skills Major in either the Arts & Culture, Construction, Hospitality & Tourism streams and Health & Wellness.

The Sequitur 
The Sequitur is Westdale's student-run school newspaper, and is one of two school newspapers in Hamilton. Students write news articles, stories, poetry, and short essays. The paper also includes cover art and illustrations designed by students. There are monthly publications of The Sequitur, where there are paper and digital copies available.

Notable alumni
Maija Blaubergs (1947–2010), feminist scholar, educational psychologist, lawyer
 Len Blum, a Hollywood writer and husband of Heather Munroe-Blum
 David Braley, (1941–2020), CFL, owner of the B.C. Lions and owns Orlick Industries in Hamilton.
 Nick Cordero, (19782020), Canadian actor
 Jeremy Fisher, (1976– ), is a professional singer.
 Diego Fuentes, (1970-), is an actor.
 Daniel Goldberg, producer of films such as Space Jam and Road Trip.
 Eleanor Harvey, (1995-), foil fencer
 Harry Howell, (1932–2019), Hockey Hall-of-Famer, longtime star for the New York Rangers of the National Hockey League.
 Russ Jackson, (1936– ), CFL Hall-of-Fame football player.
 Frank Kerr (1956–2008) (more commonly known as Frankie Venom) was the lead singer of Teenage Head
 Caissie Levy, is a Broadway actress who played a lead in Ghost the Musical, Penny in Hairspray, Sheila in Hair and will star in the Broadway revival of Les Misérables.
 Eugene Levy, (1946– ), is a Canadian Emmy- and Grammy Award-winning actor, television director, producer, musician and writer.
 Edwin B. Minden is a Canadian judge who sits on the Superior Court of Justice.
 Raymond Moriyama, (1929 – ), architect whose work includes the Ontario Science Centre and Brock University's Mackenzie Chown Complex.
 John Munro, (1931–2003), was a Canadian politician. Hamilton's John C. Munro International Airport is named after him.
 Rupinder Nagra, (1970-), is an actor.
 Diana Panton, (– ), is a jazz singer and Juno Award winner.  Panton is both an alumna and a teacher at Westdale.
 Alex Pierson, (1971-), is a news broadcaster.
John Lawrence Reynolds (1939–), novelist and non-fiction writer, twice winner of the Arthur Ellis Award
 Gord Lewis, founding guitarist of the band Teenage Head
 Nathan Rogers, (1979 – ), is a singer, songwriter, and performer.
 Myron Scholes, (1941– ), is a Nobel Laureate in Economics, 1997. He is currently affiliated with Stanford University.
 Martin Short, (1950– ), is an Emmy Award-nominated Canadian-American comedian, actor, screenwriter, singer and producer.
 Steve Staios, (1973– ), is a Canadian professional NHL hockey player and member of the Edmonton Oilers.
 Tim St. Pierre (1986– ) is a Canadian football player.
 Shona Thorburn, (1982– ), is a professional basketball player, a point guard for the Seattle Storm of the WNBA.
 Brian Williams, (1946– ), is a Canadian sportscaster who is best known for his coverage of the Olympic Games.
 Jim Young, (1943– ), is a former professional American football and Canadian football player.

See also
List of high schools in Ontario

References

External links

Educational institutions established in 1931
High schools in Hamilton, Ontario
International Baccalaureate schools in Ontario
1931 establishments in Ontario